Laurus Technical Institute was an American for-profit technical college with three locations in Georgia. Founded in 1986 as ETI Careers Institute, the school offered travel and tourism programs. It became accredited in 1991. In 2007, the school changed its name to Laurus Technical Institute and began offering programs in the allied health and allied trade programs.

CEO Terry Hess closed the school without notice in March 2015.

Accreditation 
Laurus Technical Institute was accredited by the Accrediting Commission of Career Schools and Colleges (ACCSC) and authorized by Georgia's Nonpublic Postsecondary Education Commission. Laurus Technical Institute also participated in federal Title IV Student Assistance programs and was approved for the training of veterans in the state of Georgia.

Programs 
Medical Assistant
Medical billing and Coding
Medical Office Administration
HVAC training (Heating, Ventilation, Air Conditioning and Refrigeration

Locations 
Decatur, Georgia
Jonesboro, Georgia
Atlanta, Georgia

See also
List of colleges and universities in Georgia (U.S. state)

References

External links
Laurus Technical Institute Official Web Site
Accrediting Commission of Career Schools and Colleges of Technology Official Web Site

Technological universities in the United States